An Attorney-General's Department or Department of [the] Attorney[-]General is a government department in certain countries. Often, it is the office of an attorney general, the chief legal advisor to a government.

Americas
State of Hawaii Department of the Attorney General

Asia
Attorney General's Department (Sri Lanka)

Oceania
Attorney-General's Department (Australia)
 Attorney-General's Department (South Australia)